Eligibility may refer to:
 The right to run for office (in elections), sometimes called passive suffrage or voting eligibility
 Desirability as a marriage partner, as in the term eligible bachelor
 Validity for participation, as in eligibility to enter a Competition
 Eligibility for the NBA draft
 Eligible receiver, gridiron football rules for catching a pass
 NCAA eligibility, requirements to play college sports in the National Collegiate Athletic Association
 FIFA eligibility rules, requirement to play for a national team in association football